Diary of a Wimpy Kid: The Ugly Truth is a 2010 bestselling children's fiction book by American author and cartoonist Jeff Kinney and is the fifth book in the Diary of a Wimpy Kid series. The Ugly Truth sold 548,000 copies in its initial week of publication, edging out Decision Points, which sold 437,000 copies.

Kinney initially struggled with the decision of whether Greg would be a non-aging "cartoon character" or a literary character that would age and go through puberty, deciding to make puberty one of the book's themes. Kinney also debated over whether to end the series with five books, eventually deciding to continue the series.

Summary

This story begins with Greg explaining that since he and his best friend Rowley have had a big fight in the previous book, their friendship has been "history". Susan Heffley, Greg's mother, announces that she will be going back to college for a few months in order to stimulate her mind. As a result, the Heffley men must take care of themselves, and most stability falls apart. Food is often ruined, and since Susan usually does the chores around the house, Greg is short of clean clothes to wear. With Susan in college, Greg's father, Frank, gives Greg the responsibility of waking himself up in the morning. Greg tries a wind-up alarm clock, which he believes will be more effective than his last one, and puts it under his bed so that he has to get out of bed to find it. But with the clock ticking loudly under the bed, he feels like he is on top of a bomb and is therefore unable to sleep. As a result, Greg accidentally activates the school fire alarm in his sleep-deprived state, causing the entire school to evacuate. The fire department is called, but no fire is found. Everyone goes back in, and the principal tells them that whoever pulled the alarm will be suspended and should turn themselves in. Greg decides to keep a low profile about the culprit and does not get caught, but a rumor goes around that the fire alarm squirts an invisible liquid when the handle is pulled, which the teachers could detect with a special wand. Many dismiss this rumor as a trick for the teachers to see who goes to wash their hands first. As a result, no one goes to wash their hands, and since it is the middle of flu season, the school closes early. Since Susan is studying, Greg has to call Frank from work to pick him up, which Frank is not happy about.

Susan then announces to the family that they will get "domestic help" with a maid named Isabella, since both parents are busy, who will help take care of the kids after school. However, instead of doing her responsibilities, Isabella secretly spends her time watching television and eating the Heffleys' snacks, leaving Greg and the rest of the family with extra work. Worse, Greg finds a pantyhose sock in his bed, showing Isabella has been napping there. Meanwhile, Greg gets ready for a dentist appointment, but Frank takes Greg to his dentist, Dr. Salazar Kagan (who takes oral health seriously) because he thinks Greg is too old for his usual dentist, Rachel. As Dr. Kagan cleans his teeth, Greg accidentally bites Dr. Kagan's finger while having X-rays taken, which results in him wearing headgear for his overbite. The next day, Greg loses his headgear and when he comes back home from school, he finds Manny wearing it. Not wanting to let his social life get ruined, Greg vows never to wear the headgear again regardless of what the dentist says.

Later, Greg finds out that the school is having a lock-in for Friday night, in which participants would sleepover and spend time doing activities. Greg signs up, but when he arrives, he is shocked that 90% of the crowd is all boys, and even worse for him, Rowley is also there as well. During the sleep period, the boys make multiple attempts to leave the school building after their phones are confiscated by the chaperones and are unable to contact their parents. However, at around 2:00 AM, most of the parents arrive at the school, angry because the kids weren't able to answer their cell phones, sending them all into a panic. As a result, most of the kids go home early, leaving Greg and Rowley behind as the only kids without cell phones. The following week, Greg becomes sick due to a lack of sleep at the Lock-In. Although he has faked sick in the past, Susan takes his temperature and agrees that he genuinely is sick. She leaves him with Isabella. Greg later falls asleep but wakes up due to the noise from downstairs. He looks out his window and sees a bunch of cars parked in front of the house. Susan comes home to take care of Greg and finds out Isabella invited all the maids in the neighborhood to watch soap operas. As a result, she fires Isabella, which pleases Greg. The next day at school, Greg sees Rowley with a big pimple on his forehead and he tells Greg that his mom says he's becoming a man, which irks Greg. Afterward, Greg finds out he is growing slower in puberty than Rowley. At home, Susan and Frank talk about their experiences being late bloomers to Greg. The next day, Rowley shows off his pimple to some girls, which Greg finds annoying, so he writes a fake note to Rowley signed "The Girls" about no one liking his zit, which worked out on him.

Later, Greg and Rowley are invited to a party by an older kid named Jordan Jury, a popular kid in the grade above him. Greg is excited because there are going to be girls there. However, Susan tells him he cannot go because his uncle and Frank's brother, Gary Heffley, has his fourth wedding the same day. Greg calls Rowley that he can't go to the party and states that it's unfair for Rowley to go without him, but Rowley insists on going, saying he can make his own decisions. Greg is worried about being the reader of the Old Testament because adults think it's cute when a kid cannot pronounce a word. On Saturday the Heffleys prepare for the wedding and Greg is nervous about getting "The Talk" from his 95-year-old great-grandmother, Gammie. Meanwhile, in the car, Susan calls Gammie about being late because they have to pick up Greg's tuxedo. Greg is thrilled because he thinks he's going to be a groomsman. After they arrive at Gammie's, Greg meets multiple family members including Uncle Gary and his fiancee Sonja. Later that evening, Greg has to sleep in a crowded room with all the family bachelors, which include Rodrick, Manny, Uncle Gary, Benjy Heffley, Charlie Heffley (also known as Uncle Charlie), Terrance Heffley, and Arthur Heffley. Greg sneaks out and instead sleeps in the bathroom, waking up just in time before Gammie's bath.

A few hours before the wedding rehearsal dinner, Greg complains about the lack of entertainment at Gammie's, and how old and valuable her belongings are. Greg explains how he ate some old taffy the year before and got sick. Then he finds a photo of his father, Frank eating the same candy when he was a kid. Later Greg finds out during the wedding rehearsal that he was going to be an assistant flower boy to Manny, and not a groomsman, much to his dismay. On the day of the wedding, after the ceremony, the Heffleys go into the hall where food was getting served and Uncle Gary's best man Leonard gave a toast of how Uncle Gary and Sonja got engaged. When Gary and Sonja went to a baseball game, Gary was about to have a break-up talk with Sonja so he could date her sister. But then an airplane with a banner reading "Marry me Sonja?", which wasn't meant for Gary's Sonja, coincidentally flew over the stadium and Sonja reacted to it. Sonja is upset after hearing that and Greg thinks they will divorce soon.

After the wedding, Greg gets the talk from Gammie where she talks to him about how getting older is not all it is cracked up to be. It is also revealed upon returning to school that Greg basically dodged a bullet by not going to the party since the real reason Jordan invited kids in Greg's grade was to use them (Rowley included) as servants. Greg and Rowley ultimately go back to being friends again when Greg chose to make a difference instead of just waiting for Rowley to come to him.

Reception
Critical reception for The Ugly Truth has been mostly positive, with the book gaining praise from the Los Angeles Times and the National Post. The School Library Journal gave a positive review for the entry while Common Sense Media commented that the book wasn't as "fresh and irreverent" as its predecessors.

References

Diary of a Wimpy Kid
2010 American novels
Novels by Jeff Kinney
American children's novels
Amulet Books books
Puffin Books books
2010 children's books